D-Mannosamine (2-amino-2-deoxymannose) is a hexosamine derivative of mannose.

See also 
 Neuraminic acid

References 

Hexosamines